George L. Saal (December 2, 1918 – July 21, 1996) was an American politician and businessman.

Saal was born in Pekin, Illinois. He served in the United States Marine Corps during World War II. Saal was involved in the insurance business in Pekin, Illinois. Saal served on the Tazewell County Board from 1946 to 1950. He served as sheriff of Tazewell County from 1950 to 1954 and from 1958 to 1962. Saal was a Democrat. Saal served in the Illinois House of Representatives from 1954 to 1958, from 1962 to 1964, and from 1966 to 1968. Saal also worked for the Illinois Comptroller. Saal died at the Methodist Medical Center in Peoria, Illinois.

Notes

External links

1918 births
1996 deaths
People from Pekin, Illinois
Military personnel from Illinois
Businesspeople from Illinois
County board members in Illinois
Illinois sheriffs
Democratic Party members of the Illinois House of Representatives
20th-century American politicians
20th-century American businesspeople